Logan Run is a  long 1st order tributary to Buffalo Creek in Brooke County, West Virginia.

Course
Logan Run rises about 1 mile northeast of West Liberty, West Virginia, and then flows northeast to join Buffalo Creek about 0.25 miles southwest of Bethany.

Watershed
Logan Run drains  of area, receives about 40.2 in/year of precipitation, has a wetness index of 291.52, and is about 45% forested.

See also
List of rivers of West Virginia

References

Rivers of West Virginia
Rivers of Brooke County, West Virginia